Hanzade Sultan may refer to:
 Hanzade Sultan (daughter of Ahmed I) (1607-1650), Ottoman princess
 Hanzade Sultan (daughter of Şehzade Ömer Faruk) (1923-1998), Ottoman princess, Egyptian princess consort